The Liebethaler Grund is a narrow, deeply incised valley of the Wesenitz river in the vicinity of Liebethal near Pirna. The valley is a popular walking trail, the Poet-Musician-Artist Way (Dichter-Musiker-Maler-Weg) and is describedas the "Gateway to Saxon Switzerland“ (on the classic route). In the vicinity of an old hydropower station is the largest Wagner memorial in the world.

Gallery

External links 
 The Artists Way on the website of the Saxon Switzerland National Park
 Information about climbing areas
 Rock information by the German Alpine Club

Valleys of Saxony
Landforms of Saxon Switzerland
Pirna